Just Another Day in Paradise is the debut album by American singer-songwriter Bertie Higgins, released in 1982.

Singles from the album include the title track, the Top 10 single "Key Largo" and "Casablanca", both tributes to the 1942 film of the same name.

"Casablanca" was recorded by Japanese singer Hiromi Go in the same year and reached No. 2 on the Japanese chart. Higgins' original version and album also achieved commercial success, and was the second best-selling album of 1982 by a Western artist in Japan's official hit parade, Oricon.

Track listing
"Just Another Day in Paradise" (Bertie Higgins, C. Jones, Sonny Limbo) – 3:56
"Casablanca" (John Healy, Higgins, Limbo) – 4:34
"Candledancer" (Higgins) – 3:48
"Key Largo" (Higgins, Limbo) – 3:20
"Port O' Call (Savannah '55)" (Higgins) – 3:26
"White Line Fever" (Higgins, Limbo) – 3:59
"The Heart Is the Hunter" (Higgins) – 3:27
"She's Gone to Live on the Mountain" (Higgins) – 3:26
"Down at the Blue Moon" (Higgins) – 3:57
"The Tropics" (Higgins) – 7:00

Personnel
Bertie Higgins: Main Vocals, Acoustic & Electric Guitars, Cymbals, Percussion
Gloria Higgins-Burke, Doug Johnson, Mann & Phyllis Loiacono, Lu Moss, Dave Powell, Suzi Smith, Mike Sullivan, Cheryl Wilson: Vocal Backing
Ken Bell, Shelton Irwin, Barry Richmond: Acoustic & Electric Guitars
Jeff Pinkham: Acoustic & Electric Guitars, Mandolin
Norman Blake: Mandolin
John Healy: Keyboards & Piano
Steve Nathan: Keyboards, Piano, Organ
Ed Leamon: Sax
Gary Baker, Arch Pearson: Bass
Owen Hale, Bill Marshall: Drums
Mickey Buckins, Edward Higgins: Congas & Percussion

Charts

Album

Singles

Certifications

References

1982 debut albums
Bertie Higgins albums